"Sacrifice" is a song by English musician Elton John, written by John and Bernie Taupin, from John's 22nd studio album, Sleeping with the Past (1989). It was first released in October 1989 as the second single from the album. It achieved success in 1990, particularly in France and the United Kingdom, becoming John's first solo chart-topper in both nations. The song describes how hard it is to stay faithful and devoted in a marriage, challenging the mantra that a successful union requires sacrifice. Due to the song's success, John has played this song in various locations in the years since it was released.

Chart performance
"Sacrifice" was initially released as a single in 1989 but stalled at number 55 in the UK and at number 18 in the US in March 1990. In mid-1990, English DJ Steve Wright began playing the song on BBC Radio 1, soon followed by many more radio DJs. The song was then re-released as a double A-side single, along with "Healing Hands", and reached number one in the UK in June 1990. Thus, it became John's first solo number-one single in the UK Singles Chart, remaining on the top spot for five weeks. With this re-release, Elton John also got his first number one in France and stayed on the chart for 26 weeks.

Critical reception
David Giles from Music Week wrote, "Probably the best track from his slightly disappointing recent LP. Elton's in subdued, wistful mood — it's a ballad, and that's where his strength lies those days — but it bears the stamp of true songwriting genius, the innate sense of which chord goes next to make the most interesting tune."

Music video
The accompanying music video for "Sacrifice" was directed by Alek Keshishian and starred supermodel Yasmeen Ghauri and singer-songwriter Chris Isaak. The video, which follows the song's lyrics, portrays a man and woman having problems in their relationship after being married and raising a daughter. After they go their separate ways, the man raises his daughter alone.

Track listings

First release
 7-inch, cassette, and mini-CD single
 "Sacrifice"
 "Love Is a Cannibal" (from the Columbia Motion Picture Ghostbusters II)

 12-inch and CD single
 "Sacrifice"
 "Love Is a Cannibal" (from the Columbia Motion Picture Ghostbusters II)
 "Durban Deep"

Second release
 7-inch and cassette single
 "Sacrifice"
 "Healing Hands"

 12-inch and CD single
 "Sacrifice"
 "Healing Hands"
 "Durban Deep"

Personnel
 Elton John – vocals, Roland RD-1000 digital piano
 Guy Babylon – Yamaha DX7
 Fred Mandel – Roland Alpha Juno synthesizers
 Peter Iverson – Fairlight and Audiofile programming 
 Davey Johnstone – electric guitar
 Romeo Williams – bass
 Jonathan Moffett – Linn LM-1 programming

Charts and sales

Weekly charts

Year-end charts

Certifications and sales

Samples
This song, along with other Elton John songs "Rocket Man", "Kiss the Bride" and "Where's the Shoorah?", was sampled in the 2021 collaboration between John and Dua Lipa titled "Cold Heart".

References

1989 singles
1989 songs
1990 singles
Elton John songs
European Hot 100 Singles number-one singles
MCA Records singles
Music videos directed by Alek Keshishian
The Rocket Record Company singles
Song recordings produced by Chris Thomas (record producer)
SNEP Top Singles number-one singles
Songs with lyrics by Bernie Taupin
Songs with music by Elton John
UK Singles Chart number-one singles